Wipeout is an American game show that aired from September 12, 1988, to June 9, 1989, with Peter Tomarken as host. The series was produced by Dames-Fraser Productions, and was distributed in first-run syndication by Paramount Domestic Television.

Main game

First round
Three contestants competed on each episode. Initially, each game featured three new contestants. After several weeks, a returning champion and two new contestants competed.

The contestants were given a category and shown 16 possible answers on a 4-by-4 grid of monitors. Eleven answers were correct, while the five incorrect ones were referred to as "wipeouts". The contestant in the leftmost position began the round. The contestant in control chose one answer at a time; each correct answer awarded money, while finding a wipeout reset the score to zero and ended his/her turn. After each correct answer, the contestant could either choose again or pass control to the next contestant. The first correct answer of the round was worth $25, and the value of each subsequent answer increased by $25, with the last one worth $275.

The round ended once all eleven correct answers were found or if all five wipeouts had been selected. The two contestants with the highest money totals kept their earnings and continued on, while the third place contestant left with parting gifts and, if the contestant had been the champion, any prior winnings. If there was a tie for low score, the tied contestants were given a new category and shown 12 answers (eight right, four wipeouts). They alternated choosing one answer at a time, with a coin toss to decide who would start, and the first contestant to find a wipeout was eliminated. If all eight correct answers were found, the contestant who gave the last one advanced.

One of the eleven correct answers was referred to as the "Hot Spot", with a prize attached to it. Once the Hot Spot was uncovered, Tomarken would take a token from inside his podium and place it on the desk of the contestant that found it. In order to win the Hot Spot prize, a contestant had to both be in possession of the token at the end of the round and have a high enough score to advance to the Challenge Round. If the contestant holding the Hot Spot uncovered a wipeout, the token was taken away and another answer was designated as the Hot Spot.

Challenge Round
The two remaining contestants advanced to the Challenge Round, playing for a bonus prize and to become the day's champion.

For each category in the Challenge around, the contestants were shown a board with 12 answers, eight correct and four Wipeouts, and they bid back and forth as to how many correct answers they thought they could name. Bidding ended when one contestant either reached the maximum of eight or challenged the other. If the high bidder successfully completed the bid, he/she won the board. One mistake allowed the opponent a chance to steal the board by giving one of the remaining correct answers still on the board. If the opponent could not do so, the high bidder was given another chance to fulfill his/her bid.

The Challenge Round was played as a best two-of-three. The high scorer from the first round started the bidding on the first board, while his/her opponent led off for the second. If a third board was needed, a coin toss decided who would start the bidding. The first contestant to win two boards became champion. The opponent kept whatever money and prizes he/she had won in the first part of the game.

Bonus round
The bonus round used a grid of 12 monitors arranged in three rows of four. The champion attempted to win a new car by identifying six correct answers in a category within sixty seconds. After the champion was shown the category and twelve possible answers, he/she selected six. The champion touched the border on the outside of the corresponding monitor and the screen illuminated. Once six monitors were lit, the champion ran and hit a buzzer to lock in the answers. If there were less than six correct, Tomarken told the champion how many he/she had correctly chosen and the champion made changes. The process repeated until all six correct answers were found or time ran out. If the champion managed to find all six answers within the time limit, he/she won the car and retired undefeated. Otherwise, the champion returned until beaten.

Broadcast 
Reruns of the series later aired on the USA Network from 1989 to 1991.

International versions

References

External links
 

1988 American television series debuts
1989 American television series endings
First-run syndicated television programs in the United States
1980s American game shows
Television series by CBS Studios
English-language television shows